Michael John Bell (born October 14, 1972) is an American college baseball coach and former pitcher. Bell is the head coach of the Pittsburgh Panthers baseball team.

Amateur career
Bell attended Riverview High School in Sarasota, Florida. As a member of the baseball team, Bell was a two-time All-Area selection. Upon graduation from Riverview, Bell enrolled at Pasco–Hernando State College. Bell was the first ever baseball signee in the history of Pasco–Hernando State, helping the Bobcats build their field, and hitting the first home run in program history. After graduating from Pasco–Hernando State, Bell accepted a baseball scholarship offer from Florida State University. In 1993, he played collegiate summer baseball with the Bourne Braves of the Cape Cod Baseball League. Bell helped the Seminoles to back-to-back College World Series appearances in 1994 and 1995.

Professional career
The Montreal Expos selected Bell in the tenth round as a pitcher, with the 563rd overall selection, of the 1995 MLB Draft. The Expos assigned Bell to the Vermont Expos of the Rookie-level New York–Penn League, where he made seven appearances before he was promoted to the Albany Polecats where he appeared in 12 games and had a 3.48 ERA.

Bell pitched for the Delmarva Shorebirds of the Class A South Atlantic League and the West Palm Beach Expos of the Class A-Advanced Florida State League in 1996, finishing the year with a 2.88 ERA in 53 games. In 1997, he played the entire season with West Palm Beach. He returned to Class A-Advanced when Expos changed their affiliate to the Jupiter Hammerheads. Bell finished the season with the Baltimore Orioles organization with the Frederick Keys. He had 7 wins, with a 2.94 ERA and 7 saves.

Bell played the final two seasons of his career with the Bowie Baysox. Bell flipped between long relief and starting, recording a 7–8 record with a 4.90 ERA.

Coaching career
Following the conclusion of his playing career, Bell was named the head coach of Brandon High School in Brandon, Florida. He led the school to a regional semifinal finish in 2002 as well as a Class 4A-District 9 championship. He was named area coach of the year by the Florida Athletic Coaches Association. After two seasons at Brandon, Bell was named the pitching coach for Florida Southern College. The Mocs earned two berths in the NCAA Regionals, going 2–2 in Bell's two seasons with the team.

On August 9, 2004, Bell was hired as the pitching coach for the Tennessee Volunteers baseball team. In his first season with the Volunteers, Bell helped Luke Hochevar bounce back from an injury to earn the Southeastern Conference Baseball Pitcher of the Year and the Roger Clemens Award.

In 2007, Bell was named the pitching coach for the Oklahoma Sooners baseball program.

On June 24, 2011, Bell was hired as the pitching coach at Florida State.

On July 10, 2018, Bell was named the 8th head coach in the history of the Pittsburgh Panthers baseball program.

Head coaching record

See also
 List of current NCAA Division I baseball coaches

References

External links

Tennessee Volunteers bio
Florida State Seminoles bio
Pittsburgh Panthers bio

Living people
1972 births
Baseball pitchers
Baseball first basemen
Pasco–Hernando State Bobcats baseball players
Florida State Seminoles baseball players
Bourne Braves players
Vermont Expos players
Albany Polecats players
Delmarva Shorebirds players
West Palm Beach Expos players
Jupiter Hammerheads players
Frederick Keys players
Bowie Baysox players
High school baseball coaches in the United States
Florida Southern Moccasins baseball coaches
Tennessee Volunteers baseball coaches
Oklahoma Sooners baseball coaches
Florida State Seminoles baseball coaches
Pittsburgh Panthers baseball coaches
Riverview High School (Sarasota, Florida) alumni